Doerge is a surname. Notable people with the surname include:

 Craig Doerge (born 1947), American musician
 Everett Doerge (1935–1998), American politician
 Jean M. Doerge (born 1937), American teacher and politician
 Rebecca Doerge, American statistician